Giuseppe Ghedina (25 October 1898 – 27 September 1986) was an Italian cross-country skier who competed in the 1924 Winter Olympics. He was born in Cortina d'Ampezzo. In 1924 he finished tenth in the 50 kilometre competition. Further results were:
 1925:
 2nd, Italian men's championships of cross-country skiing, 50 km
 2nd, Italian men's championships of cross-country skiing, 18 km

References

Biography of Giuseppe Ghedina 

1898 births
1986 deaths
Italian male cross-country skiers
Olympic cross-country skiers of Italy
Cross-country skiers at the 1924 Winter Olympics
People from Cortina d'Ampezzo
Sportspeople from the Province of Belluno